The Pro-Wrestling: EVE Championship is a women's professional wrestling world championship created and promoted by the British professional wrestling promotion Pro-Wrestling: EVE. On 9 April 2011, Britani Knight became the inaugural champion after defeating Nikki Storm in the finals of an 21-woman tournament. Since then, there has been 19 reigns shared among 13 different wrestlers. Alex Windsor is the current champion in her first reign.

History 

On 8 April 2011, 21 wrestlers entered a two days tournament to crown the first Pro-Wrestling: EVE champion, which was eventually won by Britani Knight, after she defeated Nikki Storm in the finals to become the inaugural champion.

Reigns 

Combined reigns

References 

Women's professional wrestling championships